The Fussball Club Basel 1893 1977–78 season was their 84th season since the club was founded. It was their 32nd consecutive season in the top flight of Swiss football after they won promotion during the season 1945–46. They played their home games in the St. Jakob Stadium. René Theler was voted as club chairman at the AGM. This was Theler's second period as chairman.

Overview

Pre-season
Helmut Benthaus was first team manager for the thirteenth consecutive season. During the off-season there were only two changes in the squad. Goalkeeper Hans Küng joined from Xamax and Hansruedi Schär joined from lower tier FC Oensingen. All other mutations were internal between the first team and the reserves. Basel played a total of 54 games in their 1977–78 season. 32 in the domestic league, four in the Swiss Cup, four in the Swiss League Cup, two in the European Cup, four in the Cup of the Alps and eight were friendly matches. The team scored a total of 125 goals and conceded 88. Roland Schönenberger was the team's overall top goal scorer with 26 goals, Detlev Lauscher and Erni Maissen each netted 15 times.

Domestic league
Basel played in the 1977–78 Nationalliga A. This was contested by the first 10 teams from the previous season and the two newly promoted teams Etoile Carouge and Young Fellows Zürich. The champions would qualify for the 1978–79 European Cup and the Swiss Cup winners would qualify for 1978–79 Cup Winners' Cup. The UEFA modified the entry rules for Switzerland again and, therefore, this season only two teams would qualify for the 1977–78 UEFA Cup. Due to the fact that Basel were reigning champions and because there were only minor mutations in the squad, the club's primary aim was to defend their championship title. The Nationalliga A was played in two stages. The qualification phase was played by all 12 teams in a double round robin, and after completion of this stage, the teams were divided into two groups. The first six teams contended in the championship group (with half the obtained points in the first stage as bonus) and the positions seventh to twelfth contended the relegation group (also with half the obtained points as bonus). Basel ended the qualification round in fourth position and ended the championship group in third position with 27 points, two points behind Grasshopper Club and one behind Servette. They failed their championship aim, being beaten 2–4 by the Grasshoppers in the very last game of the season.

Basel scored a total of 74 goals conceding 48 in their 32 domestic league games. Roland Schönenberger was the team's top goal scorer with 16 league goals. Detlev Lauscher, Erni Maissen and Jörg Stohler each scored 9 goals.

Swiss Cup and League Cup
In the first round of the Swiss Cup Basel were drawn against FC Lerchenfeld Thun and this was the first time that these two clubs had ever played against each other. Basel won this away game 4–2. In the next round they beat Zürich away 3–1 and St. Gallen at home 4–1 in the quarter-final. Therefore Basel advanced to the semi-finals before being knocked out of the competition by Grasshopper Club. Servette won the competition this season. In the first round of the Swiss League Cup Basel were drawn against Wettingen. Also in this competition Basel advanced to the semi-finals before being knocked out. St. Gallen won the competition beating Grasshopper Club 3–2 in the final.

European Cup and Coppa delle Alpi
As reigning Swiss champions Basel were qualified for the 1977–78 European Cup and in the first round they were drawn against Austrian champions FC Wacker Innsbruck. After a home defeat  and an away win, this competition was concluded after the first round, Wacker won 3–2 on aggregate. In the Coppa delle Alpi Basel played in group B together with Bastia, Olympique Lyonnais and Lausanne-Sport. But with only one win and three defeats they ended the group stage in last position in the table.

Players 

 
 

 
 
 
 
 

  
  

 
 
 
 
 
 

Players who left the squad

Results 
Legend

Friendly matches

Pre- and mid-season

Winter break

Nationalliga

Qualifying phase matches

Qualifying phase table

Championship group matches

League standings

Swiss Cup

Swiss League Cup

St. Gallen won 5–4 on penalties.

European Cup

First round

Wacker won 3–2 on aggregate.

Coppa delle Alpi

Group B matches

NB: teams did not play compatriots

Group standings

See also
 History of FC Basel
 List of FC Basel players
 List of FC Basel seasons

References

Sources
 Rotblau: Jahrbuch Saison 2015/2016. Publisher: FC Basel Marketing AG. 
 Die ersten 125 Jahre. Publisher: Josef Zindel im Friedrich Reinhardt Verlag, Basel. 
 Switzerland 1977–78 at RSSSF
 Swiss League Cup at RSSSF
 Cup of the Alps 1977 at RSSSF

External links
 FC Basel official site

FC Basel seasons
Basel